Stallhagen Ab is a craft brewery in the municipality of Finström on Åland (Finland). The brewery was founded in 2004 as Ålands Bryggeri Ab and got its current name in 2009. Jan M. Wennström has served as the company CEO since 2010. Stallhagen was the only brewery in Åland before the founding of the Open Water Brewery craft brewery in 2016.

Stallhagen's production premises are located in the village of Grelsby in the municipality of Finström, about 18 kilometres from Mariehamn. In connection to the production premises is also Pub Stallhagen which serves as a pub, a restaurant and an event centre. With about 50 thousand visitors per year the pub is one of the most popular tourist destinations in Åland.

In 2018 Stallhagen's product line included 23 different beers. In July 2014 the brewery introduced a beer called Stallhagen Historic Beer 1842. Its recipe is based on a Belgian beer from 1842 that was found in 2010 in the so-called Föglö wreck.

References

External links
 Official site
 Ålands Bryggeri at Pörssitieto.fi

Breweries in Finland
Companies of Åland